16β,17α-Epiestriol, or 16,17-epiestriol, also known as 16β-hydroxy-17α-estradiol, as well as estra-1,3,5(10)-triene-3,16β,17α-triol, is a minor and weak endogenous steroidal estrogen that is related to 17α-estradiol and estriol. Along with estriol, 16β,17α-epiestriol has been detected in the urine of women during the late pregnancy stage. It shows preferential affinity for the ERβ over the ERα.

See also
 16β-Epiestriol
 17α-Epiestriol
 Epimestrol

References

Estranes
Estrogens